Potassium phosphate is a generic term for the salts of potassium and phosphate ions including:
 Monopotassium phosphate (KH2PO4) (Molar mass approx: 136 g/mol) 
 Dipotassium phosphate (K2HPO4) (Molar mass approx: 174 g/mol)
 Tripotassium phosphate (K3PO4) (Molar mass approx: 212.27 g/mol)

As food additives, potassium phosphates have the E number E340.

References

E-number additives
Potassium compounds
Phosphates